Aatolana is a genus of crustaceans in the family Cirolanidae, first described by Niel L. Bruce in 1993. The genus name is from the Greek,  Aatos (insatiable), and refers to the ability of shrimp of this genus to devour fish carcasses. The type species is Aatolana rapax.

It is found in waters off the coasts of Western Australia, the Northern Territory, Queensland and New South Wales.

Species 
WoRMS lists three species:

 Aatolana rapax Bruce, 1993
 Aatolana schioedtei (Miers, 1884)
 Aatolana springthorpei Keable, 1998

References

External links 

 Aatolana occurrence data from GBIF

Cymothoida
Crustaceans of Australia
Crustaceans described in 1993
Taxa named by Niel L. Bruce